Aplidium is a genus of colonial sea squirts, tunicates in the family Polyclinidae. There are about 188 species in the genus found in shallow waters around the world.

Species

The following species are listed in this genus according to the World Register of Marine Species:

Aplidium abditum Kott, 2006
Aplidium abyssum Kott, 1969
Aplidium accarense (Millar, 1953)
Aplidium acropodium Monniot & Gaill, 1978
Aplidium acroporum Kott, 1992
Aplidium adamsi Brewin, 1946
Aplidium aegeaensis (Hartmeyer, 1904)
Aplidium agulhaense (Hartmeyer, 1912)
Aplidium albicans (Milne-Edwards, 1841)
Aplidium altarium (Sluiter, 1909)
Aplidium amorphatum Kott, 1963
Aplidium amphibolum Millar, 1982
Aplidium annulatum Sluiter, 1906
Aplidium antillense (Gravier, 1955)
Aplidium appendiculatum (Michaelsen, 1923)
Aplidium arenatum (Van Name, 1945)
Aplidium areolatum (Delle Chiaje, 1828)
Aplidium asperum Drasche, 1883
Aplidium aurorae (Harant & Vernières, 1938)
Aplidium australiense Kott, 1963
Aplidium bacculum Kott, 1992
Aplidium balleniae Monniot & Monniot, 1983
Aplidium benhami (Brewin, 1946)
Aplidium bermudae (Van Name, 1902)
Aplidium bilinguae Monniot & Monniot, 1983
Aplidium bilingula Monniot & Monniot, 2006
Aplidium brementi (Harant, 1925)
Aplidium brevilarvacium Kott, 1963
Aplidium brevisiphonis Millar, 1964
Aplidium breviventer Monniot & Monniot, 2001
Aplidium broomeiensis Millar, 1963
Aplidium caelestis Monniot, 1987
Aplidium caeruleum (Sluiter, 1906)
Aplidium californicum (Ritter & Forsyth, 1917)
Aplidium cellis Monniot, 1987
Aplidium cerebrum Monniot & Monniot, 2001
Aplidium challengeri Brunetti, 2007
Aplidium chthamalum Millar, 1982
Aplidium circulatum (Hartmeyer, 1912)
Aplidium circumvolutum (Sluiter, 1900)
Aplidium claviforme Hartmeyer, 1912
Aplidium clivosum Kott, 1992
Aplidium coei (Ritter, 1901)
Aplidium colelloides (Herdman, 1886)
Aplidium colini Monniot & Monniot, 1999
Aplidium confusum Sanamyan, 2000
Aplidium congregatum Kott, 1992
Aplidium conicum (Olivi, 1792)
Aplidium coniferum Kott, 1963
Aplidium constellatum (Verrill, 1871)
Aplidium constrictum (Sluiter, 1900)
Aplidium controversum Monniot & Monniot, 1996
Aplidium convergens Monniot & Monniot, 2006
Aplidium cottrelli (Brewin, 1957)
Aplidium crateriferum (Sluiter, 1909)
Aplidium crustatum Monniot, Monniot, Griffiths & Schleyer, 2001
Aplidium crustum Kott, 2008
Aplidium cunhense Millar, 1967
Aplidium cyaneum Monniot & Monniot, 1983
Aplidium cyclophorum Monniot & Monniot, 2001
Aplidium dakarensis (Peres, 1948)
Aplidium densum (Giard, 1872)
Aplidium depressum Sluiter, 1909
Aplidium diaphanum (Drasche, 1883)
Aplidium didemniformis Monniot & Gaill, 1978
Aplidium directum Kott, 1973
Aplidium disiphonium (Beniaminson, 1975)
Aplidium distaplium Kott, 1992
Aplidium draschei Brunetti, 2007
Aplidium dubium (Ritter, 1899)
Aplidium effrenatum (Herdman, 1886)
Aplidium elatum Kott, 1972
Aplidium elegans (Giard, 1872)
Aplidium enigmaticum Monniot C. & Monniot F., 1973
Aplidium erythraeum (Michaelsen, 1919)
Aplidium eudistomum Kott, 2008
Aplidium exiguum (Herdman, 1886)
Aplidium exile (Van Name, 1902)
Aplidium falklandicum Millar, 1960
Aplidium fistulosum Monniot & Monniot, 1991
Aplidium flavolineatum (Sluiter, 1898)
Aplidium fluorescum Kott, 1992
Aplidium foliaceum (Sluiter, 1900)
Aplidium formosum Kott, 2006
Aplidium fragile (Redikorzev, 1927)
Aplidium fuegiense (Cunningham, 1871)
Aplidium fumigatum Herdman, 1886
Aplidium funginum (Sluiter, 1898)
Aplidium galeritum (Hartmeyer, 1912)
Aplidium gastrolineatum Kott, 1992
Aplidium gelasinum Kott, 1992
Aplidium gelatinosum (Medioni, 1970)
Aplidium geminatum Kott, 1992
Aplidium gibbulosum (Savigny, 1816)
Aplidium gilvum Millar, 1982
Aplidium glabrum (Verrill, 1871)
Aplidium glaphyrum Millar, 1982
Aplidium globosum (Herdman, 1886)
Aplidium gracile Monniot & Monniot, 1983
Aplidium griseum Kott, 1992
Aplidium grisiatum Kott, 1998
Aplidium haesitans Monniot, Monniot, Griffiths & Schleyer, 2001
Aplidium haouarianum (Pérès, 1956)
Aplidium herdmani Brunetti, 2007
Aplidium hians (Monniot & Gaill, 1978)
Aplidium hortulus Brunetti, 2007
Aplidium hyacinthum Kott, 2008
Aplidium hyalinum (Pérès, 1956)
Aplidium imbutum Monniot & Monniot, 1983
Aplidium incubatum Kott, 1992
Aplidium indicum (Renganathan & Monniot, 1984)
Aplidium inflorescens Kott, 1992
Aplidium intextum Monniot & Monniot, 2001
Aplidium inversum (Pérès, 1959)
Aplidium irregulare (Herdman, 1886)
Aplidium jacksoni Kott, 1963
Aplidium japonicum (Tokioka, 1949)
Aplidium knoxi (Brewin, 1956)
Aplidium kottae Brunetti, 2007
Aplidium kurilense (Beniaminson, 1974)
Aplidium laevigatum (Herdman, 1886)
Aplidium laticum Kott, 2006
Aplidium lebedi Sanamyan, 1998
Aplidium lenticulum Kott, 1992
Aplidium lineatum Monniot & Monniot, 1996
Aplidium litum Monniot & Monniot, 2006
Aplidium lobatum Savigny, 1816
Aplidium lodix Kott, 1992
Aplidium longithorax Monniot, 1987
Aplidium longum Monniot, 1970
Aplidium loricatum (Harant & Vernières, 1938)
Aplidium lubricum (Sluiter, 1898)
Aplidium lunacratum Kott, 1992
Aplidium macrolobatum Kott, 1992
Aplidium magellanicum Sanamyan & Schories, 2003
Aplidium magnilarvum Kott, 1992
Aplidium marchei (Monniot, 1969)
Aplidium maritimum (Brewin, 1958)
Aplidium maroccanum (Sluiter, 1927)
Aplidium maru Monniot & Monniot, 1987
Aplidium mauritaniae Sluiter, 1915
Aplidium mediterraneum (Hartmeyer, 1909)
Aplidium meridianum (Sluiter, 1906)
Aplidium mernooensis (Brewin, 1956)
Aplidium millari Monniot & Monniot, 1994
Aplidium minisculum Kott, 1992
Aplidium miripartum Monniot & Monniot, 1983
Aplidium monile Monniot, Monniot, Griffiths & Schleyer, 2001
Aplidium monoophorum Millar, 1975
Aplidium monotonicum (Tokioka, 1954)
Aplidium multilineatum Kott, 1992
Aplidium multipapillatum Millar, 1975
Aplidium multiplicatum Sluiter, 1909
Aplidium multisulcatum Millar, 1977
Aplidium mutabile (Sars, 1851)
Aplidium nadaense (Nishikawa, 1980)
Aplidium nema Monniot F. & Monniot C., 1976
Aplidium nordmanni (Milne-Edwards, 1841)
Aplidium nottii (Brewin, 1951)
Aplidium novaezealandiae Brewin, 1952
Aplidium oamaruensis (Brewin, 1950)
Aplidium ocellatum Monniot C. & Monniot F., 1987
Aplidium opacum Kott, 1963
Aplidium ordinatum (Sluiter, 1906)
Aplidium ornatum Kott, 1992
Aplidium orthium Millar, 1982
Aplidium ovum Monniot & Gaill, 1978
Aplidium paessleri (Michaelsen, 1907)
Aplidium pallidum (Verrill, 1871)
Aplidium panis Kott, 2008
Aplidium pantherinum (Sluiter, 1898)
Aplidium paralineatum Kott, 1992
Aplidium parastigmaticum Kott, 1992
Aplidium parvum Kott, 1963
Aplidium patriciae Brunetti, 2007
Aplidium pellucidum (Leidy, 1855)
Aplidium pentatrema (Monniot, 1972)
Aplidium pererratum (Sluiter, 1912)
Aplidium peresi Monniot, 1970
Aplidium peruvianum Sanamyan & Schories, 2004
Aplidium petrense Michaelsen, 1916
Aplidium petrosum Kott, 1992
Aplidium phortax (Michaelsen, 1924)
Aplidium pictum Monniot & Monniot, 2001
Aplidium pliciferum (Redikorzev, 1927)
Aplidium polarsterni Tatian, Antacli & Sahade, 2005
Aplidium polybunum (Redikorzev, 1927)
Aplidium polyglossum Redikorzev, 1930
Aplidium polytrema (Monniot C. & Monniot F., 1983)
Aplidium powelli (Brewin, 1958)
Aplidium profundum (Sluiter, 1909)
Aplidium proliferum (Milne-Edwards, 1841)
Aplidium pronum Kott, 1975
Aplidium propinquum (Van Name, 1945)
Aplidium protectans (Herdman, 1899)
Aplidium pseudolobatum (Pérès, 1956)
Aplidium pseudoradiatum Millar, 1982
Aplidium punctum (Giard, 1873)
Aplidium pusillum Monniot & Monniot, 1991
Aplidium quadrisulcatum Millar, 1960
Aplidium quadriversum Millar, 1982
Aplidium quinquesulcatum Millar, 1977
Aplidium radiatum (Sluiter, 1906)
Aplidium radicosum (Monniot C. & Monniot F., 1979)
Aplidium recumbens (Herdman, 1886)
Aplidium retiforme (Herdman)
Aplidium rhabdocormi Nishikawa, 1990
Aplidium ritteri (Sluiter, 1895)
Aplidium robustum Kott, 1992
Aplidium rosaceum Monniot & Monniot, 2001
Aplidium rosarium Kott, 1992
Aplidium rubricollum Kott, 1963
Aplidium rubripunctum Monniot & Monniot, 1997
Aplidium rubrum (Tokioka, 1962)
Aplidium ruzickai Sanamyan & Gleason, 2009
Aplidium sacciferum Monniot & Monniot, 2001
Aplidium sagamiense (Tokioka, 1967)
Aplidium sagresensis Ramos-Espla, Turon & Vazquez, 1993
Aplidium sarasinorum (Fiedler)
Aplidium scabellum (Michaelsen, 1924)
Aplidium schaudinni Hartmeyer, 1903
Aplidium schultzei Hartmeyer, 1913
Aplidium scyphus Monniot & Monniot, 1991
Aplidium seeligeri Millar, 1960
Aplidium siderum Monniot & Monniot, 1983
Aplidium siphonum (Brewin, 1956)
Aplidium soldatovi (Redikorzev, 1937)
Aplidium solidum (Ritter & Forsyth, 1917)
Aplidium solum Monniot & Monniot, 1974
Aplidium spauldingi (Ritter, 1907)
Aplidium spitzbergense Hartmeyer, 1903
Aplidium spongiforme (Herdman, 1886)
Aplidium stanleyi Millar, 1960
Aplidium stellatum (Verrill, 1871)
Aplidium stelliferum (Sluiter, 1900)
Aplidium tabachniki Sanamyan & Sanamyan, 1999
Aplidium tabarquensis Ramos-Espla, 1991
Aplidium tabascum Kott, 1992
Aplidium takii (Tokioka, 1959)
Aplidium tasmaniensis Sanamyan & Sanamyan, 1999
Aplidium tenuicaudum (Beniaminson, 1974)
Aplidium thomasi Brewin, 1948
Aplidium thomsoni Brewin, 1946
Aplidium translucidum (Ritter, 1901)
Aplidium traustedti Millar, 1977
Aplidium tridentatum (Daumézon, 1909)
Aplidium triggsense Kott, 1963
Aplidium tuberosum Kott, 2008
Aplidium turbinatum (Savigny, 1816)
Aplidium undulatum Monniot & Gaill, 1978
Aplidium unicornum Millar, 1982
Aplidium uouo Monniot & Monniot, 1987
Aplidium urgorrii Vazquez, 1994
Aplidium uteute Monniot & Monniot, 1987
Aplidium vanhoeffeni Hartmeyer, 1911
Aplidium variabile (Herdman, 1886)
Aplidium vastum (Sluiter, 1912)
Aplidium vemense Millar, 1968
Aplidium vexillum Monniot & Gaill, 1978
Aplidium violaceum (Hartmeyer, 1912)
Aplidium vulcanium Monniot & Monniot, 2001
Aplidium wroomeiensis Millar, 1963
Aplidium yamazii (Tokioka, 1949)
Aplidium yezoense Tokioka, 1967

References

Enterogona
Tunicate genera
Taxa named by Marie Jules César Savigny